Lake Walcott State Park is a public recreation area located near the Minidoka Dam  east of Acequia in Minidoka County, Idaho, United States.  The state park encompasses  on the western shore on Lake Walcott, an   impoundment of the Snake River. The Minidoka National Wildlife Refuge adjoins the park and the lake. The park's recreational offerings include disc golf, camping, picnicking, boating, fishing, and water sports.

See also

 List of Idaho state parks
 National Parks in Idaho

References

External links
Lake Walcott State Park Idaho Parks and Recreation
Lake Walcott State Park Map Idaho Parks and Recreation

State parks of Idaho
Protected areas of Minidoka County, Idaho
Protected areas established in 1999